Charles Edward Hazlett (October 15, 1838 – July 2, 1863) was a U.S. Army 1st Lieutenant during the American Civil War. He was killed on Little Round Top during the second day of the Battle of Gettysburg.

Early life

Hazlett was born in Zanesville, Ohio to Robert Hazlett and Lucy Welles Reed.  Hazlett's parents were abolitionists and supporters of the Underground Railroad in central Ohio. After briefly attending Kenyon College in Gambier, Ohio, he was accepted to the United States Military Academy at West Point, New York.  During his first year at the academy, he was court-martialed and suspended for several months, but later graduated on May 6, 1861, fifteenth in his class.

Civil War
Initially assigned to the 2nd U.S. Cavalry as a 2nd lieutenant, Hazlett was almost immediately promoted to 1st lieutenant and transferred to Battery D, 5th U.S. Artillery.
He was part of the battery during its near annihilation at the First Battle of Bull Run, fought through the battles of the Peninsula Campaign and was in command of the battery by the Second Battle of Bull Run.  Under his command, the unit also participated in the battles of Antietam, Fredericksburg, and Chancellorsville.

Gettysburg

On the second day of the Battle of Gettysburg, Hazlett's Battery (3rd Division, V Corps), consisting of six  three inch, 10 pounder Parrott rifles, was rushed to the top of Little Round Top by Brig. Gen. Gouverneur K. Warren. Maneuvering the guns by hand up the steep and rocky slope of the hill was a difficult achievement. The artillerymen were exposed to constant Confederate sniper fire and could not work the guns effectively. More significantly, they could not depress the cannons' barrels sufficiently enough to defend against incoming infantry attacks. While standing near the battery during the intense fighting, Brig. Gen. Stephen H. Weed was mortally wounded and asked to see Hazlett.  Reportedly, Hazlett came to his aid and was shot in the head as he knelt down to hear what Weed was saying. Command of the battery passed to 2nd Lt Benjamin F. Rittenhouse.

Burial
Hazlett's body was originally buried at the Jacob Weikert house near Little Round Top.  Later, his body was reinterred at Woodlawn Cemetery in Zanesville, Ohio.

In memoriam
Four months after Hazlett's death, the U.S. War Department named a redoubt near Portsmouth, Virginia in his honor.

A 19th century rock carving on Little Round Top supposedly designates the spot where Hazlett was killed.  A stone marker sitting atop the rock memorializes both him and Brig. Gen. Stephen Weed.

After the Civil War, veterans formed a local chapter of the Grand Army of the Republic in Hazlett's hometown.  The chapter was named Hazlett Post 81 in honor of Hazlett and his brother, Capt. John C. Hazlett, an infantry officer who died from a wound suffered at the Battle of Stones River.

In 2011, local Civil War enthusiasts replaced the Hazlett brothers' broken tombstones at Woodlawn Cemetery in Zanesville, Ohio.  The city designated May 14, 2011 "Hazlett Day" in honor of the event.

Notes

References
 Pfanz, Harry W.  Gettysburg:  The Second Day (Chapel Hill, NC:  University of North Carolina Press), 1998.  
 Sergent, Mary E. They Lie Forgotten: The United States Military Academy, 1856-1861, Together With a Class Album for the Class of May, 1861 (Middletown, NY: Prior King Press), 1986.
The Miscellaneous Documents of the House of Representatives For the First Session of the Fifty-first Congress, 1889-1890 (Washington, D.C.: Government Printing Office), 1891.

External links
 Hazlett's Battery monument at Gettysburg

1838 births
1863 deaths
Union Army officers
United States Military Academy alumni
People of Ohio in the American Civil War
People from Zanesville, Ohio
Union military personnel killed in the American Civil War